Starting in 1957 the US Air Force began operating a small fleet of Missile Range Instrumentation Ships to support missile test ranges. They were designated "ORV" for Ocean Range Vessel. They used the ship name prefix "USAF" (e.g.: USAF Coastal Crusader (ORV-16)). Other ships would use the prefix "USAFS", for "United States Air Force Ship".

The initial twelve Atlantic Missile Range ships were modified World War II cargo vessels. Six were FS-type ships and six were C1-M-AV-1 vessels. All were equipped with telemetry systems. Two of the C1-M-AV-1 types, Coastal Sentry and Rose Knot, were equipped with command/control transmitters.

The smaller FS types were retired by 1960. On 1 July 1964 the USAF tracking ships were transferred to the custody of the Military Sea Transportation Service (MSTS) for operation. (In 1970, the MSTS changed its name to Military Sealift Command (MSC).) The ships were redesignated from USAFS to USNS, along with the hull code "AGM", eg: USAFS Sword Knot (E-45-1852) became USNS Rose Knot (T-AGM-14). MSTS had administrative control of the ships and operational control when the ships were in port. The US Air Force Eastern Test Range had operational control when the ships were at sea. The larger C1-M-AV-1 type ships were redesignated by the Navy as AGM. The original larger ORV were out of service on the Eastern Test Range by 1969.

The US Air Force still operates a small fleet of drone recovery vessels nicknamed the "Tyndall Navy". These ships recover pieces of wreckage from drones and aerial targets from the waters of the Gulf of Mexico. The largest of these vessels are three 120-foot ships operated by the 82nd Aerial Targets Squadron, which is based at Tyndall AFB, Florida.

US Air Force ship list

Active

 Thule AB 
 Rising Star tugboat (active as of Aug 2020)
 Tyndall AFB
 82nd ATRS drone recovery watercraft (x3 120ft recovery vessels, x2 smaller boats)

Inactive
 US Army Freight and Supply (FS) Type (all retired)
 None of the FS type were formally named but were given phonetic call signs and numbers one being E-42-1836.
 USAF Echo
 USAF Foxtrot
 USAF Golf
 USAF Hotel
 USAF India
 USAF Kilo
 C1-M-AV1 Type 
 USAFS Sword Knot (E-45-1852) (scrapped)
 USAFS Rose Knot (E-45-1850) (disposed)
 USAFS Coastal Sentry (E-45-1849) (disposed)
 USAFS Coastal Crusader (E-45-1851, later ORV-16) (disposed)
 USAFS Timber Hitch (E-45-1848, later ORV-17) (disposed)
 USAFS Sampan Hitch (E-45-1861, later ORV-18) (scrapped)
 VC2-S-AP3 Type
 USAF Twin Falls Victory (scrapped)
 C4-S-A1 Type
 USAFS General Hoyt S. Vandenberg (sunk as artificial reef)
 USAFS General H. H. Arnold (struck)
 EC2-S-C1 Type
 USAFS American Mariner (sunk as target)

See also

 Eastern Test Range
 Pan American Airways Guided Missile Range Division
 Missile Test Project
 RAF Marine Branch

External links

 Navsource photos the ships (except FS types)

References

 

Research vessels of the United States
Ships